Microphones in 2020 is the fifth and final studio album by American indie folk and indie rock band the Microphones. It is the Microphones' first release in 17years, following 2003's Mount Eerie. It was released on August 7, 2020, on frontman Phil Elverum's record label P.W. Elverum & Sun.

Microphones in 2020 is a concept album consisting of one 44-minute song describing Elverum's life and musical career. The album was written and recorded entirely by Elverum. Its release was accompanied by a short film consisting of 761 printed photos taken by Elverum, which Elverum described as "lyric video...a slideshow, a powerpoint presentation, a flip book and a documentary".

Upon its announcement, fans and music publications were interested the album was credited to the Microphones and not to Mount Eerie, which Elverum had released most of his music under since 2004. The album received widespread critical acclaim.

Background and inspiration 

In 1996, Elverum began the Microphones, which soon developed a cult fanbase. He retired the moniker in 2003 and began a new project under the name Mount Eerie, the same name used as the title for the fourth Microphones album. After performing a show under the Microphones name in 2019, the attention it received led Elverum to question his "past identity" and desire to return to the project.

The project first started with Elverum "just walking around with it in [his] head and mumbling to [himself]". He then got ideas for lyrics which he refined to only "the necessary parts" and translated to written words. He wrote them down by hand in a notebook. Elverum stapled together pages of paper to keep it as one contained piece; he compared it to a scroll which was, according to him, "about nine feet long". The album was recorded between May 2019 and May 2020.

Speaking to NPR, Elverum explained that releasing the album under his old moniker was part of a self-imposed writing assignment as a musician. He wanted the album to be a "project of demystification" which evoked and prodded at the feeling and history of the Microphones—but not hindered by nostalgia, instead being long-lasting—analysed it within the scope of Elverum's life and change in perspective and rather than answer questions, simply express "how it is. The true state of all things is a waterfall".

Composition and lyrics

Composition 
Microphones in 2020 is a concept album that consists of a single 44-minute song. It begins with a seven-minute introduction composed of two double-tracked and out of phase chords—D major and F sharp minor—played on an acoustic guitar. After the introduction, more instruments are introduced: speak-singing, drums, bass, organ, electric guitar (which at times appears abruptly), and piano (which slowly crescendos).

Elverum explained that his reasoning for the intro's length was "wanting to push up against the edges, similar to extreme drone music, the way that it wears down at your sense of time and reality and makes you forget yourself", as well as symbolically representing the time between Mount Eerie and Microphones in 2020. When it was suggested that the album is a postmodern entity, Elverum stated, "Yeah well I feel it is its own weird thing, I guess. [...] I think of it more as an audiobook or something. It's like this big chunk thing that you can listen to if you want to sit down and devote some time to it."

Lyrics 
The album is mainly about Elverum's life and musical career. He discusses many significant moments in his musical career, such as the beginnings of the Microphones, the production of the 2001 album The Glow Pt. 2, watching the film Crouching Tiger, Hidden Dragon, viewing performances by Stereolab and Bonnie "Prince" Billy, and listening to "Freezing Moon" by Mayhem.

Nostalgia is a prominent theme, with both the nostalgia of Elverum and his fans discussed, as well as the question of it being positive or not being proposed. The questions Elverum had from the initial 2019 show performing under the Microphones name again are featured and explored in the album. Themes of process, form, identity, impermanence, and uncertainty are present—with the latter two themes, according to Elverum, inspired by "The trauma and mess of the last five or so years of my life".

Release 
The album was announced on June 16, 2020, and released on August 7. According to writer Conor Williams, the initial attention from fans and music publications originated from the decision for the album to be released under the Microphones, which surprised Elverum (who expected the song's length to garner the attention). The album was intentionally not released on Spotify as a form of protest.

Short film 
On August 6, an album-length short film was released to correspond with the release of the album. Distinct from traditional music videos, Elverum described it as a "lyric video", as well as "a slideshow, a powerpoint presentation, a flip book and a documentary". The video consists of 761 printed photos taken by Elverum, which are synched to the album's lyrics; at times, the video features the people and places discussed in the lyrics. It took Elverum three weeks to produce. On December 25, Elverum released the photobook Microphones in 2020 Silent Version, composed of images from the short film. Elverum created the book because he wanted the photos displayed to be appreciated in a manner that the film did not allow.

Williams compared the film to Hollis Frampton's Nostalgia. He also commented on Elverum appearing as a "ghost" in the photos (something Elverum deliberately intended). Pitchfork's Sam Sodomsky wrote that the photos added "bittersweet visual cues".

Reception

 AnyDecentMusic? summed up the critical consensus as an 8.4 out of 10.

Chris DeVille of Stereogum praised the album, writing "Microphones in 2020 affirms the value of sifting through the past from time to time, so long as you spring forward. It works so well not because it tears down those old foundations, but because it builds so beautifully upon them." The site listed it as the album of the week. A brief review in Mojo gave it four out of five stars, calling it "intimate" and "absorbing". Matt Bobkin of Exclaim! gave the album nine out of 10. Bobkin contextualized the release in Elverum's career arc as well as the sociopolitical climate in which it was released, summing it up as "Elverum's indelible stamp of style, distilled into a single track that flows like waves in the ocean or hills on the mountainside".

Clare Martin of Paste praised the introspective lyrics and delicate instrumentation, concluding, "an engrossing one-track album is no easy feat, but he draws us in with expertly rich, layered lyricism and immersive production". Quinn Moreland of Pitchfork rated the release 8.5 out of 10, giving it the site's "Best New Music" accolade. Moreland's review highlights the power of the album's lyrics and their ability to evoke mystery and memory. Konstantinos Pappis of Our Culture Mag gave the album four out of five stars, writing about the unique experience of the long song and its ability to evoke memories. Steve Kling of The Philadelphia Inquirer gave the release three out of four stars, comparing it to a good memoir as "it's intensely personal while glimpsing universal truths (and avoiding solipsism)".

Track listing
"Microphones in 2020"– 44:44

Personnel
Phil Elverum– guitar, drums, percussion, vocals, organs, piano, bass guitar
John Golden– mastering, lacquer cutting
Jimi Sharp– photography
Mirah Y. T. Zeitlyn– photography

Charts

References

External links

2020 albums
Concept albums
The Microphones albums